Aara may refer to:

Aara, a band from Switzerland
Aara, actress
Aare, a river in Switzerland
Ara (drink), a Bhutanese alcoholic beverage
Urumi, a South Asian sword of flexible steel

See also 
 Aar (disambiguation)
 Aare (disambiguation)